Iain Clough (born 22 May 1965 in Nottingham) is a British slalom canoer who competed in the early-to-mid 1990s. He finished 12th in the C-2 event at the 1992 Summer Olympics in Barcelona.

References
Sports-Reference.com profile

1965 births
English male canoeists
Canoeists at the 1992 Summer Olympics
Living people
Olympic canoeists of Great Britain
Sportspeople from Nottingham
British male canoeists